Cola lorougnonis is a species of tropical rainforest tree in the family Malvaceae. It is native to Cameroon and Ivory Coast.

References

lourognonis
Flora of Ivory Coast
Flora of Cameroon
Flora of West Tropical Africa
Endangered flora of Africa
Taxonomy articles created by Polbot